Longitarsus audisioi is a species of beetle in the subfamily Galerucinae that can be found in the village of Trabzon in  Turkey.

References

A
Beetles described in 1992
Endemic fauna of Turkey
Beetles of Asia